The spot-tailed sparrowhawk or spot-tailed goshawk (Accipiter trinotatus) is a species of bird of prey in the family Accipitridae. It is endemic to Sulawesi in Indonesia. Its natural habitats are subtropical or tropical moist lowland forest and subtropical or tropical mangrove forest.

References

Accipiter
Birds described in 1850
Endemic birds of Sulawesi
Taxa named by Charles Lucien Bonaparte
Taxonomy articles created by Polbot